Yapraklı, Elmalı is a village in the District of Elmalı, Antalya Province, Turkey.

History 
The village was originally named after an Armenian priest named 'Gügü', who once lived there. The name of the neighborhood was later changed to "Yapraklı"

Geography 
Antalya province is 132 km away, and Elmali district is 22 km away.

References

Villages in Elmalı District